Witchcult Today is the sixth studio album by English doom metal band Electric Wizard, released on 20 November 2007.

Album information
The band's fascination with horror movies and writers continues here with "Satanic Rites of Drugula", a reference to the Hammer Studios horror film The Satanic Rites of Dracula, and "Dunwich", a reference to H.P. Lovecraft's short story The Dunwich Horror; also "Black Magic Rituals & Perversions (I. Frisson Des Vampires II. Zora)" makes reference to Jean Rollin film Le Frisson des Vampires (Shiver of the Vampires) and to Italian comic book character Zora the Vampire. Furthermore, the album cover of "Witchcult Today" is edited from the poster for The Devil Rides Out and is reminiscent of a scene from the 1975 occult thriller Race with the Devil.

On 23 May 2012, Metal Blade Records issued a limited edition vinyl which contained Witchcult Today and Black Masses, in order to coincide with the 10th Maryland Deathfest.

Critical reception

Reviews for Witchcult Today were mostly positive, with Thom Jurek of AllMusic writing "Musically, Electric Wizard inhabit the same basic world of stoner/doom/sludge they always have."

Track listing

Personnel
Jus Oborn – guitar, vocals, sitar
Liz Buckingham – guitar, Hammond organ
Rob Al-Issa – bass
Shaun Rutter – drums
All lyrics – Jus Oborn
All music – Electric Wizard
Cover artwork – Jus Oborn
Produced, mixed and engineered by Liam Watson
Mastered by Noel Summerville

Release history

References

2007 albums
Electric Wizard albums
Rise Above Records albums
Candlelight Records albums